Dainik Bhaskar is India's largest Hindi-language daily newspaper owned by the Dainik Bhaskar Group. According to Audit Bureau of Circulations, it is ranked 3rd in the world by circulation and is the largest newspaper in India by circulation. Started in Bhopal in 1958, it expanded in 1983 with the launch of Dainik Bhaskar's Indore edition. Dainik Bhaskar Group is present in 12 states with 65 editions in Hindi, Marathi and Gujarati.

History 
Subah Savere was launched in 1948 to fulfill the need for a Hindi-language daily newspaper. It launched under the name Subah Savere in Bhopal and Good Morning India in Gwalior. In 1957, the newspaper was renamed Bhaskar Samachar.

In 1958, the newspaper was renamed Dainik Bhaskar. The word Bhaskar means "the Rising Sun" in English. Along with its rising sun graphic, was meant to represent a bright future.

Expansion 
By 1995, Dainik Bhaskar had emerged as the number 1 newspaper in Madhya Pradesh (MP) and was declared the fastest-growing daily in India by a readership survey. The newspaper decided to expand outside MP and identified Jaipur, the capital city of Rajasthan, as the market with the highest potential.

In 1996, Dainik Bhaskar's goal was to enter Jaipur as the No. 2 newspaper (in terms of circulation) on its first day, with 50,000 copies. To achieve this target, an in-house team of 700 surveyors surveyed 200,000 potential newspaper households in Jaipur. Based on survey feedback, they went back to each of the households surveyed to show them a prototype of the newspaper and gave them the option of an advance subscription. The customers were offered a subscription price of ₹1.50 (a discount compared to the newsstand price of ₹2), and a refund in case of dissatisfaction. When Dainik Bhaskar launched in Jaipur on 19 December 1996, it was the No. 1 newspaper by selling 172,347 copies. Amar Ujala, is a Hindi-dialect day by day daily paper distributed in India. It has 19 versions in seven states and one union domain covering 167 regions. It has a course of around two million copies. Rajasthan Patrika, the former leader had a circulation of around 100,000 copies at that time. Dainik Bhaskar successfully adopted a similar model in other cities of Rajasthan, including Jodhpur, Bikaner, Kota, Udaipur, and Ajmer Sikar, becoming the No.1 urban newspaper of the entire state by 1999.

The next target was Chandigarh. It launched a customer survey in January 2000, covering 220,000 households. At that time, the English language newspapers in Chandigarh outsold the Hindi newspapers sixfold, with The Tribune as the leader with a circulation of approximately 50,000 copies. Dainik Bhaskar's survey suggested that residents of Chandigarh preferred English newspapers due to quality perceptions. As a result, the newspaper incorporated the local Chandigarh dialect in the design, mixing Hindi and English. Dainik Bhaskar launched in Chandigarh in May 2000 with 69,000 copies sold making it No.1 in the city.

In June 2000, Dainik Bhaskar entered Haryana, with 271,000 copies.

In 2006, Dainik Bhaskar launched in Punjab with the Amritsar and Jalandhar editions and became the No.1 newspaper on the first day, displacing established legacy players. Later, it increased its presence in Punjab in Ludhiana and Bhatinda.

In 2010, Dainik Bhaskar entered the Jharkhand market with the launch of a Ranchi edition, followed by Jamshedpur and Dhanbad editions.

In January 2014, Dainik Bhaskar entered Bihar with a successful launch in Patna It followed with launch of Muzaffarpur, Bhagalpur and Gaya editions in 2015.

In April 2014, Dainik Bhaskar launched an online Hindi edition in Uttar Pradesh.

In June 2017, Dainik Bhaskar launched its Hindi News on three different platforms i.e. Android, iOS and Windows.

2021 income tax raids 
On 22 July 2021, Income Tax Department conducted tax raids at 30 locations of Dainik Bhaskar Group in Delhi, Madhya Pradesh, Rajasthan, Gujarat and Maharashtra under charges of alleged tax evasion The homes of a few of the employees were also raided. In a statement released by Dainik Bhaskar, they claimed that the raids have been done after they exposed mismanagement of COVID by the government and published true COVID-19 death statistics. They also alleged that mobile phones of the employees were seized and employees were barred from leaving.

Congress leader Jairam Ramesh said the media house is “paying the price” for its coverage during the pandemic. "Through its reporting Dainik Bhaskar has exposed the Modi regime’s monumental mismanagement of the COVID-19 pandemic. It is now paying the price. An Undeclared Emergency as Arun Shourie has said — this is a Modified Emergency," he tweeted. Several other leaders including Rajasthan chief minister Ashok Gehlot, Delhi chief minister Arvind Kejriwal, West Bengal chief minister Mamata Banerjee also condemned the incident and expressed the common viewpoint of the raids being a "mode of intimidation". The Editors Guild of India also expressed concern about the income tax raids on Dainik Bhaskar. Union Minister and BJP MP Anurag Thakur has denied any government interference and claimed agencies are doing their job. At last, it was claimed that tax evasion of 7,000,000,000 INR has taken place over the period of six years.

Editions 

Dainik Bhaskar has five editions in Madhya Pradesh, one edition in Uttar Pradesh, four editions in Chhattisgarh, 12 editions in Rajasthan, three editions in Haryana, four editions in Punjab, four editions in Bihar, three editions Jharkhand and one edition each in Chandigarh, Himachal Pradesh, Uttarakhand, Jammu and Kashmir.

References

External links
 
 

Hindi-language newspapers
Mass media in Bhopal
Mass media in Rajasthan
Daily newspapers published in India
Newspapers published in Muzaffarpur
Newspapers published in Patna
Newspapers published in Gaya, India
Newspapers published in Bhagalpur
Publications established in 1958
Mass media in Ujjain
Mass media in Indore
Newspapers published in Aurangabad, Bihar
1958 establishments in Madhya Pradesh
Indian news websites